eBoy is a pixel art group founded in 1997 by Kai Vermehr, Steffen Sauerteig and Svend Smital.

Their complex illustrations have been made into posters, shirts, souvenirs, and displayed in gallery exhibitions. They were founded on May 2, 1997. "We started working with pixels because we loved the idea of making pictures only for the screen. It’s the best way to get really sharp and clean looking results. Also, handling pixels is fun and you are forced to simplify and abstract things, which is a big advantage of this technique." eBoy is based in Berlin and Los Angeles.

Their influences come from: "Pop culture... shopping, supermarkets, TV, toy commercials, LEGO, computer games, the news, magazines..."
Kai grew up with Nintendo to inspire him, the rest of the eBoys lived in East Germany where video games did not exist.
Their work makes intense use of popular culture and commercial icons, and their style is presented in three-dimensional isometric illustrations filled with robots, cars, guns and girls. Now, most of their designs are printed and not used solely for computer screens, allowing images to get more complex with details. "If we don't work on other projects at the same time it takes about six to eight weeks to finish a very detailed cityscape, three eBoy's working on it, nearly full time. But, if we have to do it in our spare time, which happens often, it could take years to finish a picture since we can't spend so much time on it." Their style has gained them a cult following among graphic designers worldwide, as well as a long list of commercial clients. Another one of their projects are plastic Peecol toys with Kidrobot, and a line of wooden toys are to be produced under their own label.

eBoy has completed "Pixoramas" on cities like Tokyo, Paris, Rio, Berlin and London and are currently funding their newest cityscape based on San Francisco via Kickstarter. They have also worked with brands such as Coca-Cola, MTV, VH1, Adidas, Gola and Honda. They worked on creating the album cover for Groove Armada's 2007 studio album Soundboy Rock, as well as the Wombats' 2022 album Fix Yourself, Not the World.

Major Pixoramas (city and landscape scenes)
 Shift Ecity (1998)
 Berlin (1st edition 2002)
 Venice (1st edition 2002)
 Superbroncobattle (1st edition 2004)
 London (1st edition 2005)
 Cologne (1st edition 2005)
 New York (1st edition 2006)
 FooBar (1st edition 2006)
 Tokyo (1st edition 2007) NFT
 Baltimore (1st edition 2008)
 Los Angeles (1st edition 2008)
 Marseille (perspective from city, 1st edition 2009)
 Amnesty (1st edition 2009)
 Paris (1st edition 2010)
 Rio (1st edition 2011)
 Marseille (perspective from sea, 1st edition 2012)
 BazQux (1st edition 2013)
 Miami (1st edition 2014)
 San Francisco (1st edition 2015)
 Moscow (1st edition 2021) NFT

Other Notable Pixoramas
 Maker Faire (1st edition 2007)
 MIA Miami Airport (2014)

Collaborations
Adidas, Adobe, Nike, Honda, Paul Smith, Louis Vuitton, DKNY, Kidrobot, The Wombats, Yuzu, Uniqlo, FontShop, Marriott, Net-A-Porter, and many more.

Exhibitions

SuperBroncoBattle - 2004
The first solo UK exhibition of eBoy was at the Minuco underground gallery in Clerkenwell London, England.

eBoy-LA - 2008
The exhibition at Concrete Hermit in London, England, saw Los Angeles get the eBoy treatment. There was a chance to see the development of the Peecols – eBoy’s series of toys. There was the opportunity to see the Blockbob prototypes and limited editions of the figures.

References

External links
 eBoy - Official website
 eBoy - Official database
 eBoy's famous London poster
 2004 London eBoy 'SuperBroncoBattle' show at Minuco's underground gallery Clerkenwell
  2008 London 'eBoy- LA' show at Concrete Hermit
 2014 "Pixel Perfect: The Story of eBoy" The Verge
 2014 "eBoy and the perfection of pixels" The Verge on YouTube
 2008 "Eboy: Berlin's ‘godfathers of pixel’" Cafébabel
 eBoy on Foundation
 eBoy on objkt.com (hic et nunc)

Social links
 eBoy on Twitter
 eBoy on Instagram
 Project Blockbob on Twitter
 Project Blockbob on Instagram

Computer graphics organizations
1997 establishments in Canada
1997 establishments in California
1997 establishments in Germany